Doctor Chelli Lona Aphra, or simply Doctor Aphra, is a fictional character in the Star Wars franchise. Created by writer Kieron Gillen, artist Salvador Larroca, and editors Jordan D. White and Heather Antos, she first appeared in Marvel Comics' 2015 Darth Vader comic book series. Aphra became a breakout character, and began appearing in her own ongoing spin-off comic series, Star Wars: Doctor Aphra, from 2016 to 2019, before relaunching in 2020. She is a morally questionable, criminal archaeologist initially employed by Darth Vader in his efforts to replace Palpatine as leader of the Galactic Empire, who later goes into hiding from the former after betraying him to the latter and faking her death, briefly establishing a love–hate relationship with Imperial officer Magna Tolvan. Supported by droids 0-0-0 and BT-1, and later by her former partner Sana Starros, she is considered a war criminal by the Rebel Alliance. Aphra is the first original Star Wars character not from the films to lead a Marvel comic series.

Character
Doctor Aphra is a criminal archaeologist with an expert knowledge of droid and weapons technologies, with a particular interest in ancient weapons and Jedi artifacts. She travels in a unique starship called the Ark Angel, which features a custom white-and-blue paint job. StarWars.com describes Aphra as "a (mostly) morally bankrupt, in-over-her-head archaeologist" with an Asian appearance. Slate calls her "driven, selfish, decisive, and wildly unpredictable". SyFy Wire calls the character an anti-hero who "shares the snark of Han Solo and sexual charisma of Lando Calrissian, but toes the line between right and wrong far more regularly than these two characters—and more often than not steps over it into the downright naughty." IGN explains, "Aphra has all of Han's swaggery, scoundrel-y charm, but little of his noble streak." Creator Kieron Gillen notes that the character's main interest is "this weird obsession she has with uncovering old stuff".

Noting that "Aphra's sarcasm and the careful way she codes her words are a vital part of her character", StarWars.com also explains that though she is somewhat of a genius, Aphra's ability to think on her toes is what has kept her alive in situations where her genius fails her. Gillen notes that readers can never be sure what the character will or will not do. Doctor Aphra writer Si Spurrier explains that despite the expectation that Star Wars characters "will always do the right thing", Aphra makes mistakes and sometimes chooses the unexpected. Sarah Kuhn, the author of Doctor Aphra: An Audiobook Original, agreed that "[Aphra] is the definition of chaos ... You never really know exactly what she's going to do, which means that, personally, I think she's having the most fun of anyone in the Star Wars galaxy."

In creating the character, Gillen looked to what he called "The Indiana Jones archaeologist archetype", which he believed fit well into Star Wars. His original concept for Aphra was Indiana Jones and his ramshackle problem solving, but with inverted ethics. He said that Aphra falls somewhere between a hero and a villain in that "You do see her do good things and bad things." Gillen further states, "She's kind of fun but at the same time, there's a really dark heart to her." He explains, "She has this very fun-loving attitude, she's very fun to be around, but she's really bad as a person." He added:

Spurrier states that Aphra "knows that Vader is probably not a nice person. She's aware that space fascism is not necessarily a good thing but it may be the right thing for a chaotic universe." Gillen compares Aphra to Darth Vader in that fans root for both as anti-heroes, but explains that while Aphra is a "bad person in many ways", Vader is on another level as "one of the greatest villains of all time." Gillen further explains, "you can root [for her], because she makes really bad life decisions and sort of rolls with them ... She doesn't like killing people. She's not like a random murderer." He noted that Aphra is complex in that she is "adamantly pro-Empire" but tends not to obey its rules.

SyFy Wire describes Aphra as a "queer woman of color". Slate notes, "She aches for two different women who have claims to her heart—two women whom, inevitably, she must betray to survive." Gillen has confirmed Aphra's sexuality, saying he has written her primarily romantically interested in women (and as flirting with Luke Skywalker), but noted that real-world attitudes towards homosexuality "[don't] really exist in the Star Wars universe". Of Aphra's doomed relationship with female Imperial captain Magna Tolvan, Gillen said he imagined "This hard-bitten, kind of very serious kind of person chasing down this more whimsical person and the sexual tension ... the flip of it is, Aphra's the person who's also pursuing Tolvan."

Appearances

Comics

Darth Vader (2015–2016)
Aphra first appeared in issue #3 of Star Wars: Darth Vader (March 2015), which is set after the original Star Wars film and was created by writer Kieron Gillen and artist Salvador Larroca. Aphra's appearance in the comic was adapted as an audiobook released on July 21, 2020. In the story, she is recruited by Darth Vader to aid in his schemes. At the end of the series, Vader attempts to kill Aphra after she betrays him to Palpatine, but she escapes, leaving him thinking he succeeded. Gillen had originally planned to have Vader kill Aphra during the story, but realized a way that she could escape and still keep the integrity of both characters.

From 2015 to 2016, Aphra appeared in Star Wars: Vader Down, a six-issue crossover comic miniseries which includes its own debut issue, issues #13–15 of Darth Vader, and issues #13–14 of the Star Wars comic series. Concurrent with the Darth Vader series, in 2016 Aphra also appeared in the Rebel Jail arc of the Star Wars comic, which comprises Star Wars issues #16–19.

Doctor Aphra (2016–2019)
After first being teased in September 2016 as Star Wars: Classified, Star Wars: Doctor Aphra was announced in October 2016, and began to be released in December 2016. The story picks up after Vader's attempt to kill Aphra at the end of the Darth Vader series. She is in hiding so that Vader will not discover that she is alive, but needs to get back into her life as an archaeologist so she can repay her enormous debts to the Wookiee Black Krrsantan, and fulfill her promise to help locate the people who tortured him in the past. Gillen said he wanted to write the series to explore "what makes her tick and why she's doing what she's doing". Gillen wrote issues #1 to #13, and then cowrote #14 to #19 with Simon Spurrier. 

Spurrier took over for a departing Gillen as of #20. Larroca and Kev Walker shared the artwork for issue #1, with Walker doing it alone for #2 and #3, followed by Walker and various other artists rotating in and out of the series. Spurrier refocused the series to expand Aphra's adventures past the known Star Wars universe and attempt to tell stories that would be unique to Aphra's character.

The series was nominated for Outstanding Comic Book at the 30th GLAAD Media Awards. Alan Scherstuhl of Slate wrote of the series, "The stories, like Death Stars, tend to explode, but unpredictably so, with escalating twists, striking moral quandaries, and only occasionally anything like a truly happy ending." He explains, "Besides the vigorous storytelling and startling twists, the Doctor Aphra comics ... fill in shades of gray that are otherwise missing from Star Wars moral spectrum." Jesse Schedeen of IGN called Doctor Aphra "Marvel's riskiest Star Wars project to date", but noted that "the distance from the movies gives Doctor Aphra a greater sense of freedom in terms of tone, style and plot possibilities." Schedeen described the series as "very much like a Bizarro Han Solo story with a dash of Indiana Jones thrown in", and noted that it "thrives on its dark sense of humor."

In 2017, Aphra appeared in the five-issue crossover miniseries The Screaming Citadel, which is made up of its own debut issue, issues #31–32 of Star Wars, and issues #7–8 of Doctor Aphra. The initial Doctor Aphra series ended in December 2019 with issue #40. She is also the main subject of in the short comic "Epilogue", also collected in the Empire Ascendant one-shot comic, which is in turn collected in the thirteenth volume of Marvel's Star Wars series.

In 2020, the series won a GLAAD Media Award for Outstanding Comic Book.

Doctor Aphra (2020–present)
Doctor Aphra relaunched in 2020, and is set between The Empire Strikes Back and Return of the Jedi. The first issue was released digitally on May 3 (in recognition of Star Wars Day) and physically on May 27.

Other comics
Aphra also appears in flashbacks in issues of the 2019 comic Star Wars: Galaxy's Edge, as well as in the first issue of the 2020 comic Star Wars: Bounty Hunters, and mentioned in the third. Additionally, she appeared in five issues of the 2020 War of the Bounty Hunters miniseries.

Aphra co-creator Heather Antos has expressed interest in a crossover series between Aphra and Gwen Poole (another Marvel character she had co-created for The Unbelievable Gwenpool), depicting the duo as being best friends, commissioning fan art of the characters together.

Audiobook
An expanded audiobook adaptation of Aphra's introduction in the Darth Vader series, titled Doctor Aphra: An Audiobook Original, was released on July 21, 2020. Written by Sarah Kuhn, the audio drama added new scenes and featured a full voice cast, with Emily Woo Zeller voicing Doctor Aphra. The script was released in book form on April 6, 2021.

Short story

"The Trigger" (2017)
"The Trigger" is a short story written by Gillen, published in the 2017 Star Wars anthology From a Certain Point of View. Set during the 1977 Star Wars film on the day that the Empire destroys the planet Alderaan with the Death Star, the story finds Aphra captured by Imperial troops and reacting to the news of Alderaan's destruction. Slate noted:

Gillen said he wrote the story with the intent of "working out a fairly logical reason, why with her background, she thinks the Empire is bad to the alternative. If you grew up in a galactic civil war, I think peace by any means might be better than war. That's kind of Aphra's take. Aphra can handle everything. She lies to herself. But normal people? Normal people would probably like to live under a fascist regime rather than actually people just killing each other in a war. And that's a really dark hole to think about but I can buy someone believing that with Aphra's background."

Video game
Doctor Aphra is a playable character in the 2015 collectible RPG game Star Wars: Galaxy of Heroes, released on mobile devices by Electronic Arts.

Doctor Aphra was a playable character in the 2017 player versus player real-time strategy mobile game, Star Wars: Force Arena, developed by Netmarble Games and published by Lucasfilm.

Impact and reception
Increased sales of Darth Vader #3 convinced Gillen of Doctor Aphra's instant popularity, and he called the character "a big part" of the unexpected success of the Darth Vader series. Aphra became a breakout character, and was placed in her own series, Doctor Aphra, which is the first ongoing Marvel Star Wars comic focused on an original character not from the films. Gillen said in April 2018, "[Doctor Aphra] was the number two trade in February. A completely new character selling that well is shocking in comics. That kind of response is enormously impressive, as it doesn't happen often." He added, "Sal[vador Larroca] and I cooked her up but enough people have written her now to make [her] bigger than me. She definitely feels like she's outgrown me, essentially. So I quite like giving her away to other people who'll get to play with her." Aphra has also become a popular cosplay. Gillen said of Aphra's popularity:

Spurrier added:

Trent Moore of SyFy Wire deemed Aphra "arguably the best thing" about the Darth Vader series, and Catrina Dennis of StarWars.com calls her "the type of character that steals every scene she's in." Hanna Flint of SyFy Wire describes Aphra as "an edgy, cool and refreshingly diverse character", and Bria Lavorgna of StarWars.com calls her "one of the coolest characters in Star Wars right now." Noting that Aphra's first appearance was an homage to Indiana Jones, Alan Scherstuhl of Slate states that she subsequently "gains a depth that Indiana Jones never quite did", and praised the fact that Gillen has "never exploited or exoticized her sexuality." Citing Aphra's "feats of technological prowess coupled with her unpredictable personality" as the characteristics which "make her a character worth watching", Dennis writes, "Aphra has stolen the hearts of fans everywhere with her unpredictable humor and a complicated backstory that has unfolded into something much more than her introduction to the saga may have let on."

Black Krrsantan, introduced in the same Darth Vader comic as Aphra (and returning in Doctor Aphra), was introduced to the live-action Star Wars universe in the second episode of the streaming series The Book of Boba Fett.

Merchandising
In 2018, Hasbro released an action figure set of Doctor Aphra and her two killer droids, 0-0-0 and BT-1.

Doctor Aphra and her two droids have also appeared in the Star Wars: The Black Series line of 6" action figures.

References

External links
 
 
 

GLAAD Media Award for Outstanding Comic Book winners
Comics characters introduced in 2015
Xenoarchaeology in fiction
Fictional archaeologists
Fictional explorers
Fictional lesbians
Fictional outlaws
Fictional space pilots
Marvel Comics female characters
Marvel Comics LGBT characters
Star Wars comics characters
Fictional war criminals